Sobolev (or Sobolevskiy, Sobolevskii) Crater is a meteorite crater in the Far Eastern Federal District of Russia.

It is (only) 53 meters in diameter and is estimated to be less than 1000 years old. The crater is exposed at the surface.  Most related publications are in Russian, and have not been translated to English as of 2014, but an English language report of fieldwork at the site can be found in Khryanina, 1981.

References 

Impact craters of Russia
Holocene impact craters
Impact craters of the Arctic